KNLV-FM (103.9 FM, "King FM") is a radio station licensed to serve Ord, Nebraska broadcasting a country music format . It operates on FM frequency 103.9 MHz and is under ownership of MWB Broadcasting. JJ Johnnie James handles the morning show and is the host of a Party Line program.

External links

NLV
Country radio stations in the United States